Nonagon Infinity is the eighth studio album by Australian psychedelic rock band King Gizzard & the Lizard Wizard. It was released on 29 April 2016 on ATO Records. The album is designed to play as an "infinite loop" where each song segues into the next and the last song segues into the first, so that "the record can be played front-to-back-to-front-to-back and the sound won't break". The title is a reference to this idea, as there are nine songs on the album that could be played "infinitely".

Considered the band's breakthrough album, Nonagon Infinity earned positive reviews from critics and gave King Gizzard greater international exposure, while becoming their first release to make the top 20 of the Australian albums chart. The album "controversially" won Best Hard Rock/Heavy Metal album at the ARIA Music Awards of 2016, with some accusing the ARIA of miscategorizing Nonagon Infinity. The album won Best Album at the Music Victoria Awards of 2016.

Various aspects of the album are featured on later albums. The opening track, "Robot Stop", briefly features use of microtonal tuning, a technique explored further on the band's follow-up, Flying Microtonal Banana. Themes from the album are especially prevelent in the songs "Some Context," "The Reticent Raconteur," "The Lord of Lightning," "The Balrog," "The floating Fire," and "The Acrid Corpse" from their 2017 album, Murder of the Universe.

Reception 

Upon its release, Nonagon Infinity received acclaim from music critics. At Metacritic, which assigns a normalised rating out of 100 to reviews from critics, the album received an average score of 83, based on 14 reviews, indicating "universal acclaim".

Writing for AllMusic, Tim Sendra claimed that the band's inventive sound made Nonagon Infinity "not only their best album yet, but maybe the best psych-metal-jazz-prog album ever". He also called the album an "amazing prog-psych epic".

Director Edgar Wright has since cited the album as one of his favorite albums of all time, stating that "you could be forgiven for thinking you were hearing one long extended track, but my God does it rock."

Matthew Coakley of The Triangle said the album was musically a gritty, heavy, lo-fi garage rock aesthetic and created a 'never-ending loop' of an album where all the songs flow directly into one another.

Jamie McNamara of BeatRoute magazine called it "a rollicking, garage-rock epic".

In 2019, Nonagon Infinity ranked 2nd on Happy Mag list of "The 25 best psychedelic rock albums of the 2010s".

Track listing
Vinyl releases have tracks 1–4 on Side A, and tracks 5–9 on Side B.

Personnel
Credits for Nonagon Infinity adapted from liner notes.

King Gizzard & the Lizard Wizard
 Michael Cavanagh – drum kit, conga
 Ambrose Kenny-Smith – harmonica, organ
 Stu Mackenzie – vocals, electric guitar, synthesizer, organ, zurna
 Joey Walker – electric guitar, setar, synthesizer
 Cook Craig – electric guitar, synthesizer
 Lucas Skinner – bass guitar
 Eric Moore – drum kit

Production
 Wayne Gordon – recording
 Paul Maybury – recording (tracks 2, 4, 7)
 Michael Badger – vocal recording, mixing
 Stu Mackenzie – additional vocal recording, additional mixing
 Joe Carra – mastering
 Jason Galea – artwork
 Danny Cohen – photography

Charts

References

External links
 

2016 albums
ATO Records albums
King Gizzard & the Lizard Wizard albums
Flightless (record label) albums
Garage rock albums by Australian artists
Jazz fusion albums by Australian artists
Progressive metal albums by Australian artists
Psychedelic rock albums by Australian artists
Progressive rock albums by Australian artists